Duchess Caroline Mariane of Mecklenburg-Strelitz (10 January 1821 – 1 June 1876) was a member of the House of Mecklenburg-Strelitz who became The Crown Princess of Denmark as the second spouse of the future king Frederick VII of Denmark.

Biography 

Duchess Caroline Charlotte Marianne of Mecklenburg-Strelitz, was born in Neustrelitz, the daughter of George, Grand Duke of Mecklenburg-Strelitz, and his consort Princess Marie of Hesse-Cassel. She was married to His Royal Highness Crown Prince Frederick, heir apparent to the Danish throne, in Neustrelitz on 10 June 1841. . 

Very early on, the marriage proved to be a very unhappy one, due in large part to The Crown Prince's bad temperament, excessive drinking and shameless womanizing. Princess Caroline Mariane, who was described as incurably shy and nervous, lacked the ability to serve as a calming influence over her consort. After a visit to her parents in Germany in 1844, Caroline Mariane refused to return to Denmark. The divorce was completed in 1846. Following the divorce, Caroline Mariane, who retained her title, lived a quiet life in Neustrelitz. She rarely ever mentioned her former spouse, except for when Danish visitors were in the area, when she would say: He was much too bizarre!

She died quietly in Neustrelitz in 1876.

Ancestry

References

Bibliography

External links 

1821 births
1876 deaths
Danish princesses
House of Mecklenburg-Strelitz
People from Neustrelitz
Duchesses of Mecklenburg-Strelitz
Crown Princesses of Denmark
Frederick VII of Denmark
Daughters of monarchs